Kalezić is a surname of Montenegrin origin. It may refer to:

Darije Kalezić (born 1969), Swiss-born Bosnian footballer and manager
Miloš Kalezić (born 1993), Montenegrin footballer
Nina Kalezić (born 1996), Montenegrin tennis player
Slavko Kalezić (born 1985), Montenegrin singer and songwriter
Vasilije Kalezić (born 1959), Montenegrin footballer
Vasko Kalezić (born 1994), Montenegrin footballer
Zoran Kalezić (1950–2023), Montenegrin singer
Zvonko Kalezić (born 1957), Montenegrin football

Montenegrin surnames